The streak-backed tit-spinetail (Leptasthenura striata) is a species of bird in the family Furnariidae. It is found in Chile and Peru.

Its natural habitats are subtropical or tropical moist montane forest and subtropical or tropical high-altitude shrubland.

References

streak-backed tit-spinetail
Birds of the Peruvian Andes
streak-backed tit-spinetail
streak-backed tit-spinetail
Taxonomy articles created by Polbot